Metaleptyphantes is a genus of dwarf spiders that was first described by G. H. Locket in 1968.

Species
 it contains seventeen species:
Metaleptyphantes bifoliatus Locket, 1968 – Angola
Metaleptyphantes cameroonensis Bosmans, 1986 – Cameroon
Metaleptyphantes carinatus Locket, 1968 – Angola
Metaleptyphantes clavator Locket, 1968 – Congo, Angola, Kenya, Tanzania
Metaleptyphantes dentiferens Bosmans, 1979 – Kenya
Metaleptyphantes dubius Locket & Russell-Smith, 1980 – Nigeria
Metaleptyphantes familiaris Jocqué, 1984 – South Africa
Metaleptyphantes foulfouldei Bosmans, 1986 – Cameroon
Metaleptyphantes kraepelini (Simon, 1905) – Indonesia (Java)
Metaleptyphantes machadoi Locket, 1968 (type) – Cameroon, Nigeria, Gabon, Angola, Uganda, Tanzania
Metaleptyphantes ovatus Scharff, 1990 – Tanzania
Metaleptyphantes perexiguus (Simon & Fage, 1922) – Africa, Comoros
Metaleptyphantes praecipuus Locket, 1968 – Angola, Seychelles
Metaleptyphantes triangulatus Holm, 1968 – Congo
Metaleptyphantes uncinatus Holm, 1968 – Congo
Metaleptyphantes vates Jocqué, 1983 – Gabon
Metaleptyphantes vicinus Locket, 1968 – Angola

See also
 List of Linyphiidae species (I–P)

References

Araneomorphae genera
Linyphiidae
Spiders of Africa